Alice Tan Ridley (born December 21, 1952) is an American gospel and R&B singer and the mother of actress Gabourey Sidibe. Ridley advanced to the semi-finals of the NBC television series America's Got Talent, after previously winning $25,000 in the pilot episode of 30 Seconds to Fame. Ridley released her debut album Never Lost My Way at the age of 63 in September 2016.

Early life 
Ridley was born in Georgia. She is the mother of Ahmed and Gabourey Sidibe. For about 30 years, Ridley has been singing and busking in New York City subway stations, mainly at Herald Square in Midtown Manhattan. For the past six years, Ridley tours with a 7-piece band doing shows at performing arts centers across America. Her daughter Gabourey Sidibe starred in the 2009 hit film Precious and garnered critical acclaim.

On October 6, 2012, Ridley performed, for the first time in her life, with a 65-piece symphony orchestra at Ohio Northern University in Ada, Ohio.

America's Got Talent 

Overview

Ridley auditioned in New York for the fifth season of America's Got Talent. She auditioned with Etta James' hit song "At Last". She was praised by all three judges and advanced to Vegas Week. There, she was selected to move on to the Top 48, alongside fellow singer Debra Romer. On July 20, Ridley performed "Midnight Train to Georgia" by Gladys Knight. She received a standing ovation from the crowd and the judges, and was praised for her performance. She advanced to the semi-finals with AscenDance, Michael Grimm, and Antonio Restivo. Her semi-final performance of "I Have Nothing" was the first performance of the twelve of the night, with Piers Morgan calling it a great beginning for the show. When placed against Studio One Young Beast Society in the final moments of the results show the next night, both Piers Morgan and Sharon Osbourne opted for Studio One, and ended Ridley's time on America's Got Talent.

Performances and results

References

External links 
 

1952 births
America's Got Talent contestants
Living people
American street performers
American gospel singers
Singers from New York City
American contemporary R&B singers
21st-century African-American women singers